The 1943–44 İstanbul Football League season was the 36th season of the league. Fenerbahçe SK won the league for the 10th time.

Season

References

Istanbul Football League seasons
Turkey
2